The following is the list of squads that took place in the men's field hockey tournament at the 1928 Summer Olympics.

Division A

Austria
The following is the Austria roster in the men's field hockey tournament of the 1928 Summer Olympics.

August Wildam
Arthur Winter
Alfred Revi
Emil Haladik
Fritz Steiner
Erwin Nossig
Fritz Herzl
Fritz Lichtschein
Hubert Lichtneckert
Hans Rosenfeld
Hans Wald
Kurt Lehrfeld
Karl Ördögh
Josef Berger
Paul Massarek
Willi Machu

Belgium
The following is the Belgium roster in the men's field hockey tournament of the 1928 Summer Olympics.

Lambert Adelot
Claude Baudoux
Yvon Baudoux
Freddy Cattoir
Louis De Deken
Paul Delheid
Louis Diercxsens
Auguste Goditiabois
Adolphe Goemaere
Georges Grosjean
Joseph Jastine
Charles Koning
René Mallieux
André Seeldrayers
Étienne Soubre
John Van Der Straeten
Émile Vercken
Corneille Wellens
F. Carez
Ch. de Keyzer
V. de Laveleye
Jacques Rensburg

Denmark
The following is the Denmark roster in the men's field hockey tournament of the 1928 Summer Olympics.

Arne Blach
Otto Busch
Hagbarth Dahlmann
Aage Heimann
Niels Heilbuth
Henning Holst
Erik Husted
Otto Husted
Peter Koefoed
Henry Madsen
Carl Malling
Børge Monberg
Peter Prahm
Aage Norsker

India
The following is the India roster in the men's field hockey tournament of the 1928 Summer Olympics.

Richard Allen
Major Dhyan Chand
Maurice Gateley
William Goodsir-Cullen
Leslie Hammond
Feroze Khan
George Marthins
Rex Norris
Broome Pinniger
Michael Rocque
Frederic Seaman
Ali Shaukat
Jaipal Singh Munda (C)
Santosh Manglani
Kher Singh Gill
Percy Stanbrook Evans

Switzerland
The following is the Switzerland roster in the men's field hockey tournament of the 1928 Summer Olympics.

Adalbert Koch
Adolf Fehr
Charles Piot
Ernst Luchsinger
Édouard Mauris
Alfred Fischer
Fred Jenny
Henri Poncet
J. Loubert
Jean-Jacques Auberson
Maurice Magnin
Max Zumstein
Roland Olivier
René Pellarin
R. Rodé
Werner Fehr
J. Brun
E. Coppetti
F. Hermenjat
L. Joset
A. Rhinow

Division B

France
The following is the France roster in the men's field hockey tournament of the 1928 Summer Olympics.

Georges Arlin
Guy Chevalier
Pierre de Lévaque
Félix Grimonprez
Marcel Lachmann
Maurice Lanet
Roger Petit-Didier
Henri Peuchot
Bernard Poussineau
Pierre Prieur
Jacques Rivière
Jean Robin
Robert Salarnier
Jacques Simon
Charles Six
A. Bié
M. L. Guirard
Paul Imbault
H. E. J. A. Reisenthel
J. Rémusat

Germany
The following is the Germany roster in the men's field hockey tournament of the 1928 Summer Olympics.

Bruno Boche
Georg Brunner
Heinz Förstendorf
Erwin Franzkowiak
Werner Freyberg
Theodor Haag
Hans Haußmann
Kurt Haverbeck
Aribert Heymann
Herbert Hobein
Fritz Horn
Karl-Heinz Irmer
Herbert Kemmer
Herbert Müller
Werner Proft
Gerd Strantzen
Rolf Wollner
Heinz Wöltje
Erich Zander
Fritz Lincke
Heinz Schäfer
Kurt Weiß

Netherlands

The following is the Netherlands roster in the men's field hockey tournament of the 1928 Summer Olympics.

Jan Ankerman
Jan Brand
Rein de Waal
Emile Duson
Gerrit Jannink
Adriaan Katte
August Kop
Ab Tresling
Paul van de Rovaart
Robert van der Veen
Haas Visser 't Hooft
C. J. J. Hardebeck
T. F. Hubrecht
G. Leembruggen
H. J. L. Mangelaar Meertens
Otto Muller von Czernicki
W. J. van Citters
C. J. van der Hagen
Tonny van Lierop
J. J. van Tienhoven van den Bogaard
J. M. van Voorst van Beest
N. Wenholt

Spain
The following is the Spain roster in the men's field hockey tournament of the 1928 Summer Olympics.

Bernabé de Chávarri
Enrique de Chávarri
Fernando Torres-Polanco
Francisco Argemí
Francisco De Roig
Jaime Bagúña
José María de Caralt
José de Caralt
José de Chávarri
Juan Becerril
Juan Junqueras
Luis Isamat
Luis Rierola
Manuel Lobo
Santiago Goicoechea
José de Aguilera Alonso
A. Heraso Lledo

References

1928

Squads